Torturer is a death/thrash metal band, formed in 1989 in Santiago, Chile. The band is one of the most recognized Chilean metal bands beyond Chile's borders.

History

Founding
The group was founded in May 1989 by bassist and vocalist, Francisco Cautín.

Infest Records
In 1990, the band recorded its first demo, Kingdom of the Dark. and, two years later, signed a deal with the French label, Infest Records, subsequently recording the debut album, Oppressed by the Force.

In 1995, the band recorded and released an EP in Spanish, entitled Los Últimos Tiempos.

New members
In March 1997, drummer Martín Valenzuela, with guitarists Sebastián Morales and Francisco Garcés, joined the band. In June 1998, with its new lineup, Torturer featured alongside Kreator (Germany), demonstrating its musical abilities to more than 3000 audience members. That same year the band recorded the Advance L.P. 1999.

In September 1999, Garcés left the band and was replaced by Pablo Navarrete.

Rise  from the Ashes
On May 25, 2001, Torturer released an album entitled Rise  from the Ashes, symbolic of the band's absence from the public's attention and a subsequent "rebirth from the ashes" for the band. This album marked the return of the group to the music scene and was one of the band's most internationally recognized musical works. The concert for the album was documented with a 16-track recorder and the result was the band's first live recording, entitled Live from the Ashes (2002), which continued with the genre of "death metal-thrash" and was released on the Bloodbath Records label. In July of that year, Garcés returned to the band, with the intention of  contributing to Torturer's fourth album.

Apocalyptor Records signing
The band signed with Australian label, Apocalyptor Records, to release a limited edition (500 copies) picture vinyl disc of Rise from the Ashes, an unprecedented occurrence for a Chilean band of any musical genre. The vinyl record was available in 2002 and the issue was solely targeted at fans of the band.

On November 1, 2003, Torturer released its highly successful new album, entitled Purification of the Flames. The full-length recording includes seven original songs and one Sadus cover, a band that visited Chile in 2004 for the 15th anniversary of Torturer.

2007 release
It was reported that the band had been working on material for a new album that was scheduled for a 2007 release.

Current status
In December 2010, Torturer was registered as an active band signed to the Rawforce Productions record label.

Band members

Current members
 Francisco Javier Aracena Cautín: vocals, bass (1989–present)
 Rodrigo Zuñiga Gonzalez: drums (2012–present)
 Francisco Garcés: guitar (1997-1999), (2001–present)

Past members
 Marco Aguilera: guitar
 Manolo Schafler: guitar
 Omar Flores: drums
 Rodrigo Neira: guitars
 Leonardo Corvalán: drums
 Pablo Navarrete: guitar
 Sergio David Aravena Rivas :Guitar

Discography

Studio albums
Oppressed by the Force (1992)
Rise from the Ashes (2001)
The Flames of Purification (2003)
Torturer (2013)
Conjuro IV (2016)

Demos
Kingdom of the Dark (1990)
Promo Noviembre '91 (1991)	 	
Advance LP (1999)

EPs
Los Últimos Tiempos (1995)

Live albums
Live from the Ashes (2002)

Splits
Hater of Mankind - Kingdom of the Dark (1991)
Eterna Tortura - Devastnation (2008)

Compilations
Los Últimos Tiempos - Best of (2009)

See also
 Music of Chile

References

Chilean thrash metal musical groups
Chilean death metal musical groups
Chilean heavy metal musical groups